Betteshanger Park (formerly Fowlmead Country Park and Betteshanger Country Park) is a park near Deal, in Kent, England. It covers the site of a former colliery spoil tip.

History
This  park is situated on the site of a former spoil tip of the former Betteshanger Colliery, one of the largest collieries in Kent. The colliery opened in 1924–30 and closed in 1989. The spoil tip was located to the north east of the former colliery.
The original area (before the spoil tip) was known as Foulmead Marsh and the community (with help from Dover District Council) chose the name of the new park to be Fowlmead (Fowl – "bird", Mead - "meadow"). In May 2015, it was announced that the Hadlow Group had acquired Fowlmead and would be rebranding the park as Betteshanger Country Park, as part of the wider Betteshanger Sustainable Parks regeneration program. As of 2017 the organisation's website gives the name of the park as Betteshanger Park.

Fowlmead Country Park and Nature Reserve was initially developed under the management of the South East England Development Agency (SEEDA)  with £18.8 million funding from English Partnerships, as part of the National Coalfields Programme (NCP).
It was opened in May 2007 by Sir David Bellamy, in association with Sport England.

The existing visitor centre was part-funded by SEEDA and Sport England. The surface material of the entire park (shale from the colliery) was mixed with recycled green waste and fertiliser to create a rich topsoil and 130,000 shrubs and trees were planted.

Due to the effects of the coronavirus and lockdowns, the Hadlow Group went into educational administration in 2019, but the Park was then acquired by Quinn Estates, the housing and social building developers also have planning consent for 12 self-build plots beside the park. Quinn Estates helped finish the delayed construction works, including the Kent Mining Museum and Visitor Centre. The museum which was constructed in partnership with the Kent Mining Heritage Foundation (KMHF), cost £1.7 million to construct and is dedicated to Kent's mining heritage. It opened in April 2022. It is part of the newly built visitor centre which cost £6m to construct.

Wildlife
There is already an abundance of wildlife (including short-eared owl, marsh harrier, kingfisher and various species of dragonflies), which can be seen within the park's developing natural habitat (beyond the cyclists' middle section), including a lake.

Activities

The park provides many activities including walking, cycling, fossil hunting, duathlon (running and cycling), orienteering and geocaching. Families can also enjoy the play area (close to the visitor centre and car park).

The park has a smooth 3.5 km tarmac road race/time trial cycle circuit which can be divided into a 1.5 km circuit, a two kilometre circuit or the full 3.5 km circuit. The circuit is six metres wide and eight metres wide on its finishing straight. British Cycling, the UK's national governing body for cycling have described the circuit as among the best outdoor tarmac road cycle circuits in the UK. There is also a long mountain biking track around the park. Various cycling and running competitions are held at the Country Park  including a Guinness Book of Records record attempt twenty-four-hour Mobility Scooter Endurance Challenge by the Red Wheelies (Mobility Scooter Formation Team). They completed 77 laps (154 miles), smashing the previous record of 88 miles.

In 2022, the park became the only location in the UK, to hire an off-road electric vehicle called the 'e-Spider' with unique pendulum suspension by the French designed and manufactured Swincar. It is an all-terrain one-sitter leisure electric vehicle that does an hour long tour of the park.

Waiting Miner Campaign

The "Waiting Miner" statue was commissioned by the Central Electricity Generating Board and was moved from its original site (outside Richborough power station) when the coal-fired plant was decommissioned. Each of Kent’s mining communities (Betteshanger, Chislet, Snowdown and Tilmanstone), had their own recommendations for a new site for the statue, but these were ignored and eventually it was resited outside the National Coal Board’s office in Dover. The Coal Board Offices eventually closed down in 1987, leaving the statue isolated on the seafront in Dover.

In 2001, Dover District Council launched the Coalfields Heritage Initiative Kent (CHIK) project, in order to record and preserve the mining heritage of Kent. It included the creation of the Miner's Way Trail (a 30 mile cycle-route linking all the coal mining villages in East Kent).

In September 2006, the "Move The Miner" campaign was launched. The campaign committee considered Aylesham Village Square (another former mining community) or on the A258 highway at the entrance to Betteshanger Park. The Country Park on the coal field spoil heap was chosen as the new site. The next stage was to obtain planning permission and persuade everyone to agree to the new site.

The statue was moved in July 2010. The campaign group then were granted £5000 in funds from the Coalfields Regeneration Trust for seating, information boards and the plinth around the statue. The park then held the Kent Miners Festival, which took place over the Sunday and Monday of the bank holiday weekend, 29–30 August 2010. The event was so popular that it has become an annual event with the venue changing from year to year. In 2015 the festival returned to Betteshanger.

Location
Situated from along the A258 between Deal and Sandwich.

References

External links
 Betteshanger Park Website
 Mover the Miner site
 Fossils site
 Fowlmead Country Park

Country parks in Kent
Parks and open spaces in Kent